The Local Government (Boundaries) Act (Northern Ireland) 1971 was an Act of the Parliament of Northern Ireland, passed in 1971 to replace the previous system of local authorities established by the Local Government (Ireland) Act 1898. The system was based on the recommendations of the Macrory Report, of June 1970, which presupposed the continued existence of the Government of Northern Ireland to act as a regional-level authority.

Northern Ireland was to be divided into twenty-six local government districts, each consisting of a number of wards. The Act did not define the Districts exactly, but provided a list of 26 existing local government areas which would form the basis of the pattern.  It then gave the Governor of Northern Ireland the power to appoint a Local Government Boundaries Commissioner who was to report with proposed names and boundaries not later than 30 June 1972.

The Commissioner's proposals were put into effect by the Local Government (Boundaries) Order (Northern Ireland) 1972, dated 17 July 1972.

The 1971 Act created districts, but did not make provision for councils to govern them. This was done by the Local Government Act (Northern Ireland) 1972. The councils created by the latter Act came into existence on 1 October 1973.

Local government districts and wards
The following list shows the original names of the twenty-six local government districts. A number later changed their name or gained borough or city status under the Local Government Act (Northern Ireland) 1972. Also shown are the wards into which each local government district was divided. In the 1972 local government Act it stated "It shall be taken that each ward shall return one member to the council of the district in which it is situated", however by the time the first elections were held on 30 May 1973, a system of proportional representation using multi-member district electoral areas had been introduced. The electoral areas consisted of groupings of between four and eight wards, with a number of councillors being elected for each area equal to the number of wards. The wards were subsequently used as building blocks for other units such as constituencies, and census statistics have been compiled for them.

† Craigavon Urban District replaced Lurgan Rural District in 1967.

Changes and repeal
The areas established by the Act were reviewed on a number of occasions: in 1985 the number of wards was increased from 524 to 562. In 1993 the number of wards was again increased to 582, and in 1993 the ward of Rathfriland was transferred from Newry and Mourne to Banbridge district. There were also minor boundary changes, such as the transfer of rural parts of Legoniel from Belfast to Antrim in 1985.

In 1984 the name of Londonderry District was changed to Derry, and in 1999 Dungannon District was renamed Dungannon and South Tyrone.

The Act was repealed by the Local Government (Boundaries) Act (Northern Ireland) 2008.

References

External links

Local Government (Boundaries) Act (Northern Ireland) 1971 from CAIN Web Service
Review Body on Local Government in Northern Ireland 1970 (Macrory Report) from CAIN Web Service

Acts of the Parliament of Northern Ireland 1971
Districts of Northern Ireland, 1972–2015
Local government legislation in the United Kingdom